In pharmacology, a psycholeptic is a medication which produces a calming effect upon a person. Such medications include barbiturates, benzodiazepines, nonbenzodiazepines, phenothiazines, opiates/opioids, carbamates, ethanol, 2-methyl-2-butanol, GHB, cannabinoids (in some classifications), some antidepressants, neuroleptics, and some anticonvulsants. Many herbal medicines may also be classified as psycholeptics (e.g. kava)

The psycholeptics are classified under N05 in the Anatomical Therapeutic Chemical Classification System.

See also
 Analeptic
 Anxiolytics

References

External links

Medical psycholeptic
Cancer psycholeptic

 
Drug classes defined by psychological effects